J. Lee (sometimes credited as J Lee) is an American actor, writer, and musician known for playing Lt. Commander John LaMarr on the Fox/Hulu science fiction comedy drama television series The Orville.

Early life and career
Lee was born and grew up in St. Louis. He grew up playing piano and plays professionally. "I started playing classical piano when I was 3. I did that all throughout my youth and in high school. I played at Carnegie Hall when I was 12 or 13." He obtained a bachelor's degree from Indiana University's Jacob's School of Music. He worked at Fuzzy Door Productions as a receptionist where he befriended Seth MacFarlane. "People would come up and just have a conversation with me. And Seth and I became cool because when he would come out of his office or the writers room just to get a break, we would just talk about regular life and laugh." He soon began working for MacFarlane on many of his projects, furthering his acting career.

Filmography

Film

Television

References

External links
 

African-American male actors
African-American musicians
African-American writers
American male film actors
American male television actors
American male voice actors
Jacobs School of Music alumni
Living people
Male actors from St. Louis
Year of birth missing (living people)
21st-century African-American people